Sergei Sentyurin (born July 12, 1987) is a Russian professional ice hockey player. He is currently playing with Traktor Chelyabinsk of the Kontinental Hockey League (KHL).

Sentyurin made his Kontinental Hockey League debut playing with Khimik Voskresensk during the inaugural 2008–09 KHL season.

References

External links

1987 births
Living people
Avangard Omsk players
HC Dynamo Moscow players
HK Gomel players
Kapitan Stupino players
Kazzinc-Torpedo players
Khimik Voskresensk (KHL) players
Krylya Sovetov Moscow players
Metallurg Novokuznetsk players
Russian ice hockey forwards
HC Rys players
Salavat Yulaev Ufa players
HC Sarov players
Toros Neftekamsk players
Torpedo Nizhny Novgorod players
Traktor Chelyabinsk players
Zauralie Kurgan players